Pseudonocardia endophytica is a Gram-positive and aerobic bacterium from the genus of Pseudonocardia which has been isolated from the plant Lobelia clavata in Xishuangbanna in China.

References

Pseudonocardia
Bacteria described in 2009